Lyn Dwyer is a former South African international lawn bowler.

Bowls career
Dwyer won a silver medal in the Women's pairs at the 1994 Commonwealth Games in Victoria with Jo Peacock.

In 1995 she won the triples gold medal and fours silver medal at the Atlantic Bowls Championships.

References

Living people
South African female bowls players
Bowls players at the 1994 Commonwealth Games
Commonwealth Games silver medallists for South Africa
Commonwealth Games medallists in lawn bowls
Year of birth missing (living people)
Medallists at the 1994 Commonwealth Games